Thiruvithamcode Arappally ("Royal Church"; Tamil:திருவிதாங்கோடு அரப்பள்ளி; Malayalam:തിരുവിതാംകോട് അരപ്പള്ളി;), or Thomayar Kovil or St. Mary's Orthodox Church, is a church located in Thiruvithamcode in Kanyakumari District, Tamil Nadu state in India. It is believed by the Christian communities in Kerala that the historic Thiruvithamcode Arappally, also called Amalagiri church as named by the Chera King Uthiyan Cheralathan, was built by St. Thomas, known as the Apostle of India, in 63 AD. It is believed to be the world's oldest existing church structure, and is now declared an international St. Thomas pilgrim center.

It claims to be the world's oldest church that still has daily prayers and India's oldest church that hasn't been reconstructed till now. The church has three main parts built in the 17th century and a 20th-century entrance hall. Its walls are built of locally quarried stone, chiseled with a multi-tipped chisel, a technique known in Kerala and possibly introduced there by foreign contact in the 16th century.

Thiruvithamcode (also spelled Thiruvithancode, Thiruvithankodu and Thiruvithangodu) is a small panchayat town located in the Kanyakumari district of the Indian state of Tamil Nadu.
It is about 20 km from Nagercoil, and 2 km from Thuckalay.

The church  today is maintained by the Malankara Orthodox Syrian Church. Catholicos of the East and Malankara Metropolitan, Baselios Marthoma Didymos I  proclaimed the church as an international St. Thomas pilgrim center on 16 December 2007.
Legend says that the newly converted Christians during St. Thomas’ time went through a lot of persecution and a woman by the name of CHIRUTHA organized her own army called CHIRUTHA PADA (Army of Chirutha) to put up a tough fight against the persecutors. It is believed this fight continued for several decades.  Later, many of her relatives migrated to different parts of Kerala to join their siblings and families. There was a historical book written about this fight and it was widely circulated in Tamil nadu. It clearly mentions  CHIRUTHA and her army, CHIRUTHA PADA.

See also 
Ezharappallikal

References

External links 
 Website of the church (in English)

Malankara Orthodox Syrian church buildings
Churches in Kanyakumari district